Bořislav  is a municipality and village in Teplice District in the Ústí nad Labem Region of the Czech Republic. It has about 400 inhabitants.

Administrative parts
The village of Bílka is an administrative part of Bořislav.

References

Villages in Teplice District